Paratene McLeod (born 6 April 1991) is a New Zealand basketball player.

Early life
Born in Tauranga, McLeod and raised in Invercargill, where he attended Southland Boys' High School. While attending Southland Boys', he competed with the New Zealand under-16 and under-18 sides, and in 2009, he was invited to trial for the Junior Tall Blacks, but withdrew because of a knee injury.

Professional career
In January 2010, McLeod signed with the newly-established Southland Sharks for the 2010 NBL season. In August 2010, he re-signed with the Sharks for the 2011 season. He continued on with the Sharks in 2012 and 2013. He was a member of the Sharks' 2013 championship-winning squad.

In December 2017, McLeod was named in a 14-man local Southland Sharks pre-season training squad ahead of the 2018 NBL season.

References

External links
 Australiabasket.com profile
 NBL stats

1991 births
Living people
New Zealand men's basketball players
People educated at Southland Boys' High School
Point guards
Shooting guards
Southland Sharks players